Lümatu is a village in Antsla Parish, Võru County in Estonia. As of the 2021 census, the population was 80.

References

Villages in Võru County